ChemPhotoChem is a monthly peer-reviewed scientific journal that covers pure and applied photochemistry. It is published by Wiley-VCH on behalf of Chemistry Europe. The journal publishes original research covering topics such as photovoltaics, photopharmacology, imaging, analytical chemistry, and synthesis. The editor-in-chief is Deanne Nolan.

According to the Journal Citation Reports, the journal has a 2021 impact factor of 3.679.

References

External links
 

Chemistry Europe academic journals
Wiley-VCH academic journals
English-language journals
Chemistry journals
Monthly journals
Publications established in 2017